At least two ships have been named SS Oregonian:

SS Oregonian, a cargo ship launched in 1901.
She was renamed SS Oregonian in 1925 and was sunk in 1942.

See also

Ship names